Litzy Vanya Domínguez Balderas (born October 27, 1982), known by her stage name  Litzy, is a Mexican singer and actress.

Career 
Litzy is known for having been in the Mexican singing group Jeans, and for her (formerly "always" protagonist) roles in Telenovelas:  Televisa's DKDA Sueños de Juventud; Telemundo's Daniela,  Amarte así (Frijolito), and Una Maid en Manhattan; Venevisión-with-Univisión's Pecadora; and Azteca [Mexico] TV's Quiéreme Tonto, retitled simply Quiéreme.  Probably her most successful recent song is "La Rosa."  She sang the entrada song (opening theme song) for both Daniela ("Sobreviveré") and Amarte Asi ("Amarte Asi").  For Una Maid en Manhattan, she sings the entrada as a duet with Siller.  She also has recorded a theme song entitled "Pecadora" for Pecadora. However, as recently aired, the telenovela is not using that song for its entrada, but (in part) as the closing theme.  Amarte Asi has also been aired with a different title, Frijolito. It is also notable that Litzy won a sort of acting-contest reality show run by Telemundo entitled Protagonistas de la Fama. Apparently her winning of that contest landed her the starring role in Amarte Así. She also was the star of Daniela, and went on to star in Pecadora, Quiéreme Tonto (2010), and Una Maid en Manhattan (2012), a spin-off and expansion of the Jennifer Lopez movie, "A Maid in Manhattan").

Litzy definitively broke out of her Cinderella type-cast in 2014 by playing a prostitute in Telemundo's Señora Acero.

Documentation for Litzy and her telenovelas, has been posted at the Amarte-Asi forum of Telenovela-World.com.

After making Amarte Así, Litzy studied acting in Los Angeles for the better part of a year, evidently with the desire to do acting in Hollywood, a desire not fulfilled. After acting school, she has been credited with roles in three obscure Mexican movie titles before obtaining her role in Pecadora: "Vestidos y Otras Anécdotas," a short movie entitled "Subversiòn Total" (2007), and "Borderline (2009/II)."

She recently played a lesbian character in the comedy, Manual Para Galanes, directed by Alfredo Hueck.

Filmography

Films

Television performances

Awards And Nominations

Web

References

External links
 

1982 births
Living people
Mexican telenovela actresses
Actresses from Mexico City
Singers from Mexico City
20th-century Mexican actresses
21st-century Mexican actresses
21st-century Mexican singers
21st-century Mexican women singers